Lucien Cannon,  (January 16, 1887 – February 14, 1950) was a Canadian lawyer and politician.

Born in Arthabaska, Quebec, the son of Lawrence John Cannon and Aurélie Dumoulin, he studied law at the Laval University and was called to the Quebec Bar in 1910. His brother was Lawrence Arthur Dumoulin Cannon, a puisne judge of the Supreme Court of Canada. His nephew, Charles-Arthur Dumoulin Cannon, and grandson, Lawrence Cannon, were also MPs.

In 1911 federal election, he ran as a Liberal candidate for the House of Commons of Canada  in the riding of Charlevoix losing to Joseph David Rodolphe Forget. In a 1913 by-election, he was elected to the Legislative Assembly of Quebec in the riding of Dorchester. A Liberal, he was re-elected in 1916. He resigned in 1917 to run again for the Canadian House of Commons in the riding of Dorchester in a by-election. He was defeated, but was elected in the 1917 federal election. He was re-elected in 1921, 1925, and 1926. From 1925 to 1926 and again from 1926 to 1930, he was the Solicitor General of Canada. He was defeated in the 1930 federal election but was re-elected in the 1935 election for the riding of Portneuf. He resigned in 1936 when he was appointed a judge.

Electoral record

External links
 
 

1887 births
1950 deaths
Lucien
Laurier Liberals
Liberal Party of Canada MPs
Members of the House of Commons of Canada from Quebec
Members of the King's Privy Council for Canada
Judges in Quebec
Lawyers in Quebec
Quebec Liberal Party MNAs
Université Laval alumni
People from Centre-du-Québec
Quebec people of Irish descent
Quebecers of French descent
Solicitors General of Canada